Bernhardt is both a given name and a surname, deriving from multiple languages, such as German. Notable people with the name include:

Given name:
Bernhardt Esau (born 1957), Namibian politician and Deputy Ministry of Trade and Industry
Bernhardt Holtermann (1835–1885), gold miner, businessman, and politician in Australia
Bernhardt Jungmann (1671–1747), German botanist

Surname:
Arthuro Henrique Bernhardt (born 1982), Brazilian footballer
Clyde Bernhardt (1905-1986),  American jazz trombonist
Curtis Bernhardt (1899–1981), German film director
Daniel Bernhardt (born 1965), Swiss actor and martial arts expert
Dan Bernhardt (born 1958), American-Canadian economist
Ernie Bernhardt (21st century), Northwest Territories politician
Juan Bernhardt (born 1953), Dominican former Major League Baseball player
Katherine Bernhardt (born 1975), American artist
Melvin Bernhardt (born 1941), American stage and television director
Otto Bernhardt (born 1942), German politician
Patrick Bernhardt (born 1971), German racing driver
Robert Bernhardt (21st century), American conductor
Sarah Bernhardt (1844–1923), French stage actress
Tim Bernhardt (born 1958), retired professional ice hockey player
Warren Bernhardt (born 1938), American jazz pianist
William Bernhardt (born 1960), American novelist

See also
Bernhardt Creek, a stream in Oregon
Bernhardt Line, German World War II defensive line in Italy
Bernhard